Kampel ( or) is a settlement south of Škocjan in the City Municipality of Koper in the Littoral region of Slovenia.

References

External links
Kampel on Geopedia

Populated places in the City Municipality of Koper